Anacithara angulosa is a species of sea snail, a marine gastropod mollusk in the family Horaiclavidae.

Description
The length of the shell attains 5 mm, its diameter 1¾ mm.

Distribution
This marine species occurs in the Atlantic Ocean off Western Africa

References

 Nolf F. & Swinnen F. (2011) Anacithara biscoitoi (Mollusca: Conoidea: Turridae), a new species from West Sahara (W Africa). Neptunea 10(2): 16–19.

External links
  Tucker, J.K. 2004 Catalog of recent and fossil turrids (Mollusca: Gastropoda). Zootaxa 682:1-1295.

angulosa
Gastropods described in 1872